International justice may refer to:
Global justice
International Justice Mission
International law